Sharon Cather (5 August 1947 – 6 June 2019) was an art historian who taught at Cambridge University and was a professor at the Courtauld Institute of Art, where she specialised in the preservation of wall paintings.

Early life and education
Cather was born at Berkeley, California, and graduated in art history from the University of California, Santa Barbara. She spent ten years working in the art department offices there, before undertaking MA study at Princeton University and going on to undertake PhD work under Professor John Shearman on Sebastiano Serlio.

Career
From 1981 to 1982, Cather was at the American Academy in Rome, assisting Professor Irving Lavin with an exhibition on Gian Lorenzo Bernini's drawings. From 1982, she lectured in the art history department of the University of Cambridge; in 1985, she helped to establish the Conservation of Wall Painting department at the Courtauld Institute of Art.

In 2014 Cather was awarded the People's Republic of China Friendship Award (China) after a long period of collaboration with the Dunhuang Academy.

In 2017, Cather received the Plowden Medal from the Royal Warrant Holders Association citing “her commitment and leadership in research, innovation and education in wall painting conservation” towards “a more holistic, methodical and scientific approach to conserving wall painting across the world—whether in an English cathedral or an Indian palace”.

References

1947 births
2019 deaths
Academics of the Courtauld Institute of Art
Academics of the University of Cambridge
Conservator-restorers
People from Berkeley, California
Princeton University alumni
University of California, Santa Barbara alumni
American art historians
Women art historians
Historians from California